Farrukh Choriyev (born 27 July 1984) is a Tajikistan football player, who currently plays for Regar-TadAZ Tursunzoda.

International career
He has been a member of the Tajikistan national football team since 2006.

Career statistics

International

Statistics accurate as of match played 11 October 2011

International goals

Honours
Regar-TadAZ
Tajikistan Higher League (3): 2006, 2007, 2008
Tajikistan Cup (4): 2005, 2006, 2011, 2012
Tajik Supercup (3): 2011, 2012, 2013
AFC President's Cup (3): 2005, 2008, 2009
Tajikistan
AFC Challenge Cup (1): 2006

References

External links
 

1984 births
Living people
Tajikistani footballers
Tajikistan international footballers
Association football defenders